Cetonurus is a genus of rattails.

Species
The currently recognized species in this genus are:
 Cetonurus crassiceps (Günther, 1878) (globosehead rattail)
 Cetonurus globiceps (Vaillant, 1884) (globehead grenadier)

References

Macrouridae
Taxa named by Albert Günther